Elections to Fermanagh District Council were held on 21 May 1997 on the same day as the other Northern Irish local government elections. The election used four district electoral areas to elect a total of 23 councillors.

Election results

Note: "Votes" are the first preference votes.

Districts summary

|- class="unsortable" align="centre"
!rowspan=2 align="left"|Ward
! % 
!Cllrs
! % 
!Cllrs
! %
!Cllrs
! %
!Cllrs
! %
!Cllrs
!rowspan=2|TotalCllrs
|- class="unsortable" align="center"
!colspan=2 bgcolor="" | UUP
!colspan=2 bgcolor="" | Sinn Féin
!colspan=2 bgcolor="" | SDLP
!colspan=2 bgcolor="" | DUP
!colspan=2 bgcolor="white"| Others
|-
|align="left"|Enniskillen
|bgcolor="40BFF5"|47.2
|bgcolor="40BFF5"|3
|16.8
|1
|15.3
|1
|9.5
|1
|11.2
|1
|7
|-
|align="left"|Erne East
|bgcolor="40BFF5"|36.3
|bgcolor="40BFF5"|2
|32.8
|2
|15.3
|1
|4.5
|0
|11.1
|1
|6
|-
|align="left"|Erne North
|bgcolor="40BFF5"|45.6
|bgcolor="40BFF5"|2
|12.0
|1
|24.1
|1
|16.7
|1
|1.6
|0
|5
|-
|align="left"|Erne West
|bgcolor="40BFF5"|32.9
|bgcolor="40BFF5"|2
|30.2
|1
|15.8
|1
|0.0
|0
|21.1
|1
|5
|- class="unsortable" class="sortbottom" style="background:#C9C9C9"
|align="left"| Total
|40.4
|9
|23.5
|5
|17.3
|4
|7.4
|2
|11.4
|3
|23
|-
|}

District results

Enniskillen

1993: 3 x UUP, 1 x Sinn Féin, 1 x SDLP, 1 x DUP, 1 x Independent Socialist
1997: 3 x UUP, 1 x Sinn Féin, 1 x SDLP, 1 x DUP, 1 x Independent Socialist
1993-1997 Change: No change

Erne East

1993: 3 x UUP, 1 x Sinn Féin, 1 x SDLP, 1 x Independent Nationalist
1997: 2 x UUP, 2 x Sinn Féin, 1 x SDLP, 1 x Independent Nationalist
1993-1997 Change: Sinn Féin gain from UUP

Erne North

1993: 2 x UUP, 2 x SDLP, 1 x DUP
1997: 2 x UUP, 1 x SDLP, 1 x DUP, 1 x Sinn Féin
1993-1997 Change: Sinn Féin gain from SDLP

Erne West

1993: 2 x UUP, 1 x Sinn Féin, 1 x SDLP, 1 x Independent Nationalist
1997: 2 x UUP, 1 x Sinn Féin, 1 x SDLP, 1 x Independent Nationalist
1993-1997 Change: No change

References

1997 Northern Ireland local elections
20th century in County Fermanagh
Fermanagh District Council elections